Butts is a surname. Notable people with the name include:

 Alan Butts (born 1940), British Olympic wrestler
 Alfred Butts (disambiguation), multiple people
 Anthony Butts (born 1969), American poet
 Arthur C. Butts (1848–1913), American lawyer, judge, and politician
 Augustus De Butts (1770–1853), officer in the Royal Engineers
 Calvin O. Butts (born 1949), Pastor of the Abyssinian Baptist Church in the City of New York
 Cassandra Butts (1965–2016), American lawyer
 Cassius F. Butts (born 1971), American business executive
 Charles Butts (disambiguation), multiple people
 Colin Butts (1959–2018), English writer
 Clyde Butts (born 1957), West Indies cricketer
 George Butts (1838–1902), American soldier, Medal of Honor recipient
 Gerald Butts (born 1971), Canadian political adviser
 Gerard Butts (born 1966), Australian rules footballer
 Evelyn Thomas Butts (1924–1993), American civil rights activist
 Henry Butts, Vice-Chancellor of the University of Cambridge (1629–1631)
 Henry De Butts, United States Army officer, acting Adjutant General and acting Inspector General (1792–1793)
 Ingrid Butts (born 1963), American Olympic cross-country skier
 Isaac Butts (born 1989), American basketball player
 James Butts (born 1950), American triple jumper
 James T. Butts Jr. (born 1953), American politician, mayor of Inglewood, California (since 2011)
 Jimmy Butts (1917–1998), American jazz double-bassist
 John Butts (disambiguation), multiple people
 Lisa Butts (born 1982), American rugby union player
 Mr. Butts, fictional character in Garry Trudeau's Doonesbury
 Marie Butts (1870–1953), French educator, translator, and children's book author; first General Secretary of the International Bureau of Education (1926–1953)
 Marion Butts (born 1966), American football running back
 Mary Butts (1890–1937), British modernist writer
 Niya Butts (born 1978), American women's college basketball coach
 Pee Wee Butts (Thomas Lee Butts; 1919–1972), American baseball player
 Peggy Butts (1924–2004), Canadian Senator
 Ray Butts (Joseph Raymond Butts; 1919–2003), American inventor and engineer
 Robert Butts (disambiguation), multiple people
 Samuel Butts (1777–1814), American militia officer in the Creek War
 Seymore Butts (born 1964), American pornographic film director, producer, and actor
 Skyler Butts (born 1993), Hong Kong tennis player
 Tasha Butts (born 1982), American women's basketball player and coach
 Thomas Butts (1757-1845), British senior civil servant, and patron to the artist and poet William Blake
 Vibert Butts, Guyanese soccer player
 Vernon Butts, American serial killer and accomplice of William Bonin
 W. E. Butts (Walter E. Butts; 1944–2013), American poet
 Wally Butts (1905–1973), University of Georgia football head coach and athletic director
 Wanda Butts, American swimming activist
 William Butts ( – 1545), member of King Henry VIII of England's court

See also
 Charles W. Buttz (1837–1913), American politician
 Buts, surname
 Butz, surname
 Butt (surname)